Kenneth E. Priebe, Sr. (December 10, 1912 – April 1, 1986) was a member of the Wisconsin State Assembly.

Biography
Priebe was born on December 10, 1912 in Black Creek, Wisconsin. He attended school in Appleton, Wisconsin. He died on April 1, 1986.

Career
Priebe was elected to the Assembly in 1958 and re-elected in 1960. Additionally, he was President of the Appleton City Council. In 1963, Priebe became Chief Clerk of the Assembly. He was a Republican.

References

Politicians from Appleton, Wisconsin
Republican Party members of the Wisconsin State Assembly
Employees of the Wisconsin Legislature
Wisconsin city council members
1912 births
1986 deaths
20th-century American politicians
People from Black Creek, Wisconsin